László Fekete is the name of:

 László Fekete (footballer) (1954–2014), Hungarian footballer
 László Fekete (strongman) (born 1958), Hungarian strongman